The University of Cape Verde (abbreviated "Uni-CV") is the only public university of Cape Verde. The main campus is in Palmarejo, Praia, but there are also institutes in Mindelo, Assomada and São Jorge dos Órgãos. It has over 5000 students. A new campus for Uni-CV is under construction in Palmarejo, financed by the Chinese government. It should be completed by July 2020. It will have capacity for 4,890 students and 476 professors, with a library, dorms, cafeterias and sports facilities. It will have 61 class rooms, five auditoriums with a capacity of 150 seats, eight computer rooms, eight reading rooms and 34 laboratories.

History
The University of Cape Verde was created by decree-law 53/2006 of 20 November 2006 by merging of three colleges:
 ISE (Instituto Superior de Educação, High Institute of Education) in Palmarejo, Praia, created under the decree-law 54/95 of October 2, 1995
 ISECMAR (Instituto Superior de Engenharias e Ciências do Mar, High Institute of Engineering and Marine Sciences) in Mindelo, created under the decree-law 40/96, of October 21, 1996
 INAG (Instituto Nacional de Administração e Gestão, National Administration and Management Institute), in Praia, created under the resolution of 24/98 of October 21, 1998

In 2007, a fourth school officially joined the others: INIDA (Instituto Nacionai de Investigação e Desenvolvimento Agrário) in São Jorge dos Órgãos. Under the law-decree no. 29/2008 on October 9, ISE, ISECMAR and INAG were eliminated.

In the first years of its existence the school received help from King Henry VIII in teacher training and the exchange of administrative experiences. In 2014, both the university and the Camões Institute of Lisbon, Portugal created Eugénio Tavares Chair of the Portuguese language in order to boost research of teaching of Portuguese in Cape Verde. In January 2014, the rector of the university was elected for the first time. Out of three candidates, Dr Judite do Nascimento won. She was re-elected in March 2018.

Faculties and schools
The University of Cape Verde has the following faculties and schools:
 Faculty of Science and Technology (Faculdade de Ciências e Tecnologia)
 Faculty of Social Sciences, Humanities and Arts (Faculdade de Ciências Sociais, Humanas e Arte)
 Faculty of Engineering and Maritime Sciences (Faculdade de Engenharia e Ciências do Mar)
 School of Agricultural and Environmental Sciences (Escola de Ciências Agrárias e Ambientais) 
 School of Business and Governance (Escola de Negócios e Governação)
 Faculty of Education and Sports (Faculdade de Educação e do Desporto)

The Faculty of Science and Technology (FCT) was created from ISE and INEDA, and is based in Praia. It offers the following licentiate courses:

Biological Sciences
Chemical and Biological Engineering
Civil Engineering
Electrotechnical Engineering
Food Technology
Geography and Spatial Planning
Geology 
Information and Computer Engineering
Mathematics (Education and Applied Mathematics)
Mechanical Engineering
Medicine
Multimedia and Communications Technology
Nursing
Statistics and Information Management

The Faculty of Social Sciences, Humanities and Arts (FCSHA) was created from ISE, and is based in Praia and Mindelo. It offers the following licentiate courses:

Cape Verdean and Portuguese Language, Literature and Culture
Communication Sciences and Journalism
Cultural Heritage Management
Education Sciences
English Language, Literature and Culture
French Language, Literature and Culture
History (Education, Museology, Libraries and Archives)
International Relations and Diplomacy
Physical Education and Sports
Political Philosophy and International Relations
Psychology
Social Sciences

The Faculty of Engineering and Maritime Sciences (FECM) was created from ISECMAR, and is based in Mindelo. It offers the following licentiate courses:

Biological Sciences (Health, Environment and Education)
Civil Engineering
Electrotechnical Engineering
Information Engineering and Telecommunication
Marine Engineering
Mechanical Engineering
Nautical Sciences - Piloting
Nursing

The School of Agricultural and Environmental Sciences (ECAA) was created from INIDA, and is based in São Jorge and Praia. It offers the following licentiate courses:

Socio-Environmental Agronomy
Socio-Environmental Agronomy (semi-presence regime)

The School of Business and Governance (ENG) was created from INAG, and is based in Praia and Mindelo. It offers the following licentiate courses:

Business and Organizational Sciences
Commercial Management and Marketing
Economy
Hotel Management
Public Relations and Executive Secretariat

The Faculty of Education and Sports (FaAED) is based in Praia, Mindelo and Assomada. It offers the following licentiate courses:

Basic Education, focus on Art Education
Basic Education, focus on Earth and Life Sciences
Basic Education, focus on Mathematics
Basic Education, focus on Portuguese Language and Cape Verdean Studies
History and Geography
Natural Sciences

Rectors

Notable alumni
Mário Lúcio, singer and Minister of Culture, in 1982
Georgina Mello, in 2004, she later became the director general of CPLP, the Lusophony countries.

Notable professors
 Silvino Lopes Évora, journalist, writer and poet
 João Lopes Filho, anthropologist
Manuel Veiga, linguist
 Maria Baptista Soares, sociologist

See also 
 Jean Piaget University of Cape Verde
 University of Santiago, Cape Verde 
 University of Mindelo

References

External links 
  

 
Cape Verde
Praia
Mindelo
Educational institutions established in 2006
2006 establishments in Cape Verde